VKA is a premium brand vodka produced in Italy from organic wheat and spelt and Tuscan Apennines water. It was founded in 2013 by a group of entrepreneurs in Mugello, gathered around the name of Futa Pass. The  for VKA is Luca Pecorini a renowned restaurant owner, who developed the original recipe for the vodka in Barberino di Mugello. It is distributed in Asia, the Czech Republic and Italy.

Product description
Soft organic wheat and spelt used in the creation of VKA are grown in Tuscany, Italy from sustainable agriculture. Distilled in the same region with four double-effect continuous vacuum columns, the distillate is then sent to Firenzuola, north of Florence, where it is blended with filtered Mugello mountain spring water, and bottled in a Tuscan-style transparent glass bottle. The packaging has the same essential style and attention to eco-compatibility and organic materials.

The letter A in the logo is written as an upside-down V, so the Greek letter lambda (Λ) is sometimes used as a replacement: VKΛ.

References

External links
VKA Vodka official website (English and Italian)

Italian vodkas